Ebli-ye Olya (also Romanized as Eblī-ye ‘Olyā and Ebellī ‘Olyā; also known as Ablī-ye Bālā, Ibli Ulia, and Ibli-Ulya) is a village in Sanjabad-e Gharbi Rural District, in the Central District of Kowsar County, Ardabil Province, Iran. At the 2006 census, its population was 58, in 18 families.

References 

Tageo

Towns and villages in Kowsar County